The Eternal Mother can refer to:

 The Eternal Mother (1912 film), a 1912 film
 The Eternal Mother (1917 film), a 1917 film
 The Eternal Mother (1920 film), a 1920 film
 Eternal Mother (2017 film), a Burmese drama film